Linda J. Bilmes (born 1960) holds the Daniel Patrick Moynihan Senior Lecturer Chair in Public Policy and Public Finance at Harvard University.  She is a full-time faculty member at the Harvard Kennedy School where she teaches public policy, budgeting and public finance. She served as Assistant Secretary and Chief Financial Officer of the US Department of Commerce during the presidency of Bill Clinton.

She is a leading national expert on financial, budgeting, veterans and civil service issues.  Bilmes is widely credited with drawing attention to the cost of the Iraq War and to the long-term cost of caring for returning Iraq and Afghanistan war veterans. She has received numerous awards and distinctions from peace groups and veterans organizations.  She is the recipient of the 2008 “Speaking Truth to Power” Award from the American Friends Service Committee. Bilmes serves as the United States member of the United Nations Committee of Experts on Public Administration (CEPA), appointed in 2017 by the Secretary General of the United Nations and re-appointed to a second term from 2021 to 2025. She is a contributor to the Watson Institute's Costs of War Project.  She has testified to the US Congress on numerous occasions regarding the costs of the Iraq and Afghanistan wars and the long-term consequences for providing veterans care.  She co-authored the landmark centennial study of the economic value of the US National Parks System, which established a baseline value of $92 billion for the parks and programs  and co-authored a book on the economic value of national parks.

She is a faculty affiliate of the Mossavar-Rahmani Center for Business and Government, the Taubman Center for State and Local Government, the Belfer Center for Science and International Affairs and the Rappaport Institute for Greater Boston.  At Harvard, Professor Bilmes founded and directs the Rappaport Greater Boston Applied Field Lab, an advanced program in which teams of students work directly in local communities on budgeting and financial challenges. She leads budgeting workshops and training sessions for newly elected Mayors and Members of Congress run by the Harvard Institute of Politics.  Bilmes also teaches and conducts research at the Blavatnik School of Government at Oxford University, where she was a visiting fellow at Brasenose College.

She is a member of the Council on Foreign Relations and a Fellow of the National Academy of Public Administration.  She is Co-chair of Economists for Peace and Security and serves on the board of the Institute for Veterans and Military Families.

Early life and education
Bilmes was born in New York and raised in San Mateo, California, the daughter of Lila Yolanda Lynn and Murray Bilmes. Her adoptive stepfather is Myron Nye Humphrey. She was given the middle name "Jan" after her godmother, singer Jan DeGaetani. She attended public schools including Aragon High School. During her senior year, she worked as an intern for Governor Jerry Brown during his first term as Governor of California. Bilmes holds an  degree in government from Harvard University, a master's of business administration degree from Harvard Business School and a doctor of philosophy degree from the University of Oxford. She wrote her dissertation on the financing of the Afghanistan and Iraq wars.  After earning a graduate business degree, she worked as a pollster and political consultant and then as a management consultant with Bain & Company until 1987. From 1988 to 1996, she worked at management consulting company The Boston Consulting Group based in London, Madrid and Moscow. As a principal at The Boston Consulting Group, Bilmes helped build the company's United Kingdom healthcare practice, launch the Madrid office, and was appointed as one of 10 Western advisors to the Russian Ministry of Privatization, where she helped to draft Russia's first healthcare financing legislation and managed public financial restructuring projects throughout Europe.

Government service
Bilmes has held senior positions in the US government including US Assistant Secretary and CFO  of the United States Department of Commerce. Prior to joining the Harvard faculty, Bilmes served in government during the Presidency of Bill Clinton. She was confirmed twice by the U.S. Senate, first as Assistant Secretary for Administration and Budget, and additionally as Chief Financial Officer, of the United States Department of Commerce, from 1998 to 2001.  She previously served as Deputy Assistant Secretary of Commerce for Administration from 1997-1998.  She has been appointed to several high-ranking commissions, including a Treasury Department commission to examine the viability of the Inter-American Investment Corporation. From 2009 to 2011 She served as a commissioner on the bipartisan National Parks Second Century Commission.   During the Obama administration she served from 2011 to 2017 on the U.S. Department of Interior National Parks System Advisory Board and on the US Department of Labor Advisory Board on Veterans Employment and Training.

Books and publications
Bilmes is the author of several important books, book chapters and academic papers. She is co-author, with Nobel laureate Joseph Stiglitz, of The Three Trillion Dollar War, which became a New York Times and international best-seller (W.W. Norton).  She is co-author of The People Factor: Strengthening America by Investing in Public Service with W. Scott Gould. (Brookings Institution Press) and Gebt un das Risiko Zuruck with Peter Strueven and Konrad Wetzker. She is co-author with John Loomis of Valuing U.S.Parks and Programs: America's Best investment Routledge.

Articles
  Pdf.
  Non-subscription version.
  Pdf.

Personal life
Bilmes is married to Jon Hakim, a British citizen. They have three sons.

External links

Faculty Bio Bilmes' listing in Harvard University faculty directory

Bilmes, Linda "Soldiers Returning From Iraq and Afghanistan: The Long-term Costs of Providing Veterans Medical Care and Disability Benefits" 2007 
Inside Higher Ed article
Three Trillion Dollar War Blog
List of publications
Brookings Press People Factor blog
Book chapter by Linda Bilmes and Joseph Stiglitz in Lessons from Iraq: Avoiding the Next War ed. by Miriam Pemberton and William Hartung
Book chapter by Linda Bilmes and Jeffrey Neal in "For the People" ed. by John Donahue and Joseph Nye
Bilmes, Linda. Book chapter "Scoring Goals for People and Company" in Mastering People Management Ed. James Pickford. 
Joseph E. Stiglitz and Linda J. Bilmes “Estimating the costs of war: Methodological issues, with applications to Iraq and Afghanistan” in the Oxford Handbook of the Economics of Peace and Conflict. Oxford University Press: Oxford, 2010.
Bilmes, Linda and Joseph Stiglitz. "The long-term costs of conflict: the case of the Iraq War" in Handbook On the Economics of Conflict. Eds. Derek L. Braddon and Keith Hartley. Edward Elgar Publishing, June 2011.
Bilmes, Linda and Joseph Stiglitz. "The $10 Trillion Hangover: Paying the Price for Eight Years of Bush'''." Harper's, January 2009.
Bilmes, Linda and Joseph Stiglitz. "The $3 Trillion War." Vanity Fair, April 2008.
Bilmes, Linda and Joseph Stiglitz, "The Economic Cost of Iraq War." Milken Institute, 4th Qtr, October 2006.
Bilmes, Linda and W. Scott Gould.  "New Book Looks at What College Students are Thinking about Government Jobs." Federal Manager Magazine, April 2006.

1960 births
Living people
Boston Consulting Group people
Harvard Kennedy School faculty
American management consultants
Harvard Business School alumni
People from San Mateo, California